Nelson Roosevelt Gidding (September 15, 1919 – May 2, 2004) was an American screenwriter specializing in adaptations. A longtime collaboration with director Robert Wise began with Gidding's screenplay for I Want to Live! (1958), which earned him an Oscar nomination. His long-running course on screenwriting adaptions at the University of Southern California inspired screenwriters of the present generation, including David S. Goyer.

Gidding was born in New York and attended school at Phillips Exeter Academy; as a young man he was friends with Norman Mailer. After graduating from Harvard University, he entered the Army Air Forces in World War II as the navigator on a B-26. His plane was shot down over Italy, but he survived; he spent 18 months as a POW but effected an escape. Returning from the war, in 1946 he published his only novel, End Over End, begun while captive in a German prison camp.

In 1949, Gidding married Hildegarde Colligan; together they had a son, Joshua Gidding, who today is a Seattle writer and college professor.

In Hollywood, Gidding entered work in television, writing for such series as Suspense and Sergeant Preston of the Yukon, and eventually moved into feature films like The Helen Morgan Story (1957), Odds Against Tomorrow (1959), The Haunting (1963), Lost Command (1966), The Andromeda Strain (1971), and The Hindenburg (1975).

After the death of his first wife on June 13, 1995, in 1998 Gidding married Chun-Ling Wang, a Chinese immigrant.

Gidding taught at USC until his death from congestive heart failure at a Santa Monica hospital in 2004.

Filmography 

Film

Television

Bibliography

References

External links 

Gidding documents from World War II

American male screenwriters
1919 births
2004 deaths
20th-century American novelists
American male novelists
Phillips Exeter Academy alumni
Harvard University alumni
United States Army Air Forces personnel of World War II
United States Army Air Forces officers
World War II prisoners of war held by Germany
20th-century American male writers
20th-century American screenwriters
American prisoners of war in World War II